The 2012-13 Coppa Titano is the 55th season of San Marino's oldest football competition. It began on 1 September 2012 with the first games of the Group Stage and will end in May 2013 with the final. La Fiorita are the defending champions, having won their second cup final last season.

The winner of the cup final will enter the first qualifying round of the 2013–14 UEFA Europa League.

Competition format
The competition consists of two stages, the Group Stage and the Elimination Rounds. The Group Stage consists of three groups with five teams each. Every team plays two games (once "home" and once "away") against every other team in its group. The top two teams from each group, as well as the two best third-placed teams, qualify for the Elimination Rounds. The Elimination Rounds are a single-game elimination tournament. Games in the Elimination Rounds are decided by extra time and, if necessary, a penalty shootout.

Group stage
Update on 10 April

Group A

Group B

Group C

Elimination rounds

Quarterfinals
These matches took place on 20 April 2013.

Semifinals
These matches took place on 25 April 2013.

Final

References

External links
 Official website 

Coppa Titano seasons
San Marino
Coppa